Minuscule 2445 (in the Gregory-Aland numbering). It is a Greek minuscule manuscript of the New Testament, on 116 parchment leaves (16.3 cm by 13 cm). It is dated paleographically to the 12th century. A large part of the codex lost.

Description 
Originally the codex contained the text of the four Gospels. Actually it has some lacunae, at the beginning, end, and inside (Luke 1:1-17; John 1:1-12). It contains text of Mark 7:10-John 7:32. The text is written in one column per page, in 20-22 lines per page. The initial letters in red. It has breathings and accents.

The Greek text of the codex is a representative of the Byzantine text-type. Aland placed it in Category V.
It was not examined by the Claremont Profile Method.

It contains spurious texts of Luke 22:43-44 and John 5:3.4.

The codex now is located in the Bible Museum Münster (Ms. 5).

See also 

 List of New Testament minuscules (2001–)
 Textual criticism
 Bible Museum Münster

Gallery

References

External links 

 Manuscripts of the Bible Museum
 Images of manuscript 2445 at the CSNTM

Greek New Testament minuscules
12th-century biblical manuscripts